Sir Wilfrid Russell Grimwade  (15 October 1879 – 2 November 1955) was an Australian chemist, botanist, industrialist and philanthropist. He was the son of Frederick Sheppard Grimwade and brother of Harold Grimwade.

An endowment by Grimwade in 1929 was used to create the Russell Grimwade Prize, a scholarship for study of forestry. As of 2018, the annual prize value is $40,000. In 1934, he presented Cooks' Cottage to Victoria after purchasing it in England and shipping it to Australia.

He received a CBE in 1935 and was knighted in the 1950 King's Birthday Honours List.

References

Scientists from Melbourne
Australian chemists
20th-century Australian botanists
Australian manufacturing businesspeople
Australian philanthropists
1879 births
1955 deaths
Australian Knights Bachelor
Australian Commanders of the Order of the British Empire
Australian people of English descent